The Puritan was a 19th-century racing yacht and the 1885 America's Cup defender of the international sailing trophy.

Construction and service 

Designed by Edward Burgess, she was built at the George Lawley & Son yard in South Boston, Massachusetts and launched May 26, 1885. For sails, Burgess chose the Irish-born sailmaker John H. McManus of McManus & Son, of Boston. The sails were of Plymouth duck.

The Puritan was an early combination of American and English designs with some of the depth of a cutter but beam and power of a sloop. It was built and skippered by John Malcolm Forbes.

She defeated the New York Yacht Club's Priscilla then went on to defend the America's Cup against the British yacht Genesta, a traditional cutter. Immediately following the contest, they began work on an improved version which would be called the Mayflower.

References

External links

 America's Cup Official Website for the 32nd America's Cup in Valencia
 1890s Yacht Photography of J.S. Johnston

America's Cup defenders
Individual sailing vessels
Yachts of New York Yacht Club members
1885 in sports